The 1997 Korean FA Cup was the second edition of the Korean FA Cup.

Bracket

First round

Round of 16

Quarter-finals

Semi-finals

Final

Awards
Source:

See also
1997 in South Korean football
1997 K League
1997 Korean League Cup
1997 Korean League Cup (Supplementary Cup)

References

External links
Official website
Fixtures & Results at KFA

1997
1997 in South Korean football
1997 domestic association football cups